Ocyptamus cubanus is a species of syrphid fly in the family Syrphidae.

It was proposed in 2020 that this species be moved to a new genus, Nuntianus, and it is now sometimes referred to as Nuntianus cubanus.

References

Syrphini
Articles created by Qbugbot
Insects described in 1943